Kampong Selangan is a village in Temburong District, Brunei, about  from the district town Bangar. The population was 332 in 2016. It is one of the villages within Mukim Amo. The postcode is PD2751.

Facilities 
Selangan Primary School is the village's government primary school. It also shares grounds with Selangan Religious School, the village's government school for the country's Islamic religious primary education.

The village mosque is Kampong Selangan Mosque; it was inaugurated on 14 December 1979 and can accommodate 200 worshippers.

References 

Selangan